The 1995 Grote Prijs Jef Scherens was the 29th edition of the Grote Prijs Jef Scherens cycle race and was held on 3 September 1995. The race started and finished in Leuven. The race was won by Erik Dekker.

General classification

References

1995
1995 in road cycling
1995 in Belgian sport